"Päikese poole" is the second single by the Estonian band Urban Symphony. The song premiered on 22 July 2009 in the Estonian radio Star FM. The track is composed by Sven Lõhmus. It was released digitally on 24 July 2009.

Track listing 
"Päikese poole" – 3:26

Chart positions

References

2009 singles
2009 songs
Songs written by Sven Lõhmus